Scenes from the Life of Noah are a pair of 1436–1440 frescoes by Paolo Uccello in the Chiostro Verde (Green Cloister) of Santa Maria Novella in Florence. Like the other frescoes in that cloister, they deal with stories from the Book of Genesis and are in monochrome or "verdeterra" (giving the cloister its name). The upper work is the lunette The Flood and the Waters Receding (215×510 cm), with two symmetrical views of Noah's ark, whilst below is a rectangular work showing The Sacrifice and Drunkenness of Noah. They have now been transferred to canvas and were restored in 2013–2014, at which time it was considered moving them to an internal room in the complex.

Several different artists worked on frescoes in the cloister between 1420 and 1440, with Uccello the earliest with his Creation and the Fall (Uccello) . He only returned to the cycle to produce the Noah scenes just before leaving for Venice. All the frescoes in the cloister were restored in 1859 but then damaged in the 1966 Florence flood – Uccello's works were among the first to be restored, but the others are still under restoration.

An old man in The Waters Recede is shown blessing the land whilst looking at the bodies strewn around him – this may be a figure linked to the monastery (perhaps Cosimo the Elder or Pope Eugene IV – the latter was then staying there) or Noah himself, who is also shown leaving the ark.

References

Bibliography (in Italian)
 Pierluigi De Vecchi and Elda Cerchiari, I tempi dell'arte, volume 2, Bompiani, Milano 1999. 
 Annarita Paolieri, Paolo Uccello, Domenico Veneziano, Andrea del Castagno, Scala, Firenze 1991. .
 Mauro Minardi, Paolo Uccello, Rizzoli, Milano 2004.

1440 paintings
Paintings depicting Noah
Paintings by Paolo Uccello
Church frescos in Florence